Sardar Dharmanna  is a 1987 Telugu language drama film directed by Bairisetty Bhaskara Rao and produced by Yalamanchili Saibabu. The film stars Krishnam Raju, Jayasudha, Vishnuvardhan, Raadhika, Mohan Babu, and Rajani. The film had musical score by M. Ranga Rao.

Cast
Krishnam Raju
Jayasudha
Vishnuvardhan
Raadhika
Mohan Babu
Rajani

References

External links
 

1987 films
1980s Telugu-language films
Indian drama films
Films scored by M. Ranga Rao
1987 drama films